The Pilipinas VisMin Super Cup 2nd Conference, also known as the Chooks-to-Go Pilipinas VisMin Super Cup due to sponsorship reasons, is the second season of the Pilipinas VisMin Super Cup, a professional basketball league in the Philippines.

The conference will only consist a single tournament, after all Visayas-based teams filed a leave of absence for this season but had pledged to return in the third conference in 2022. The tournament billed as the Mindanao Challenge, will feature seven Mindanao-based teams.

The Zamboanga Sibugay Warriors are the champion of the Mindanao Challenge.

Teams

Player quotas
Each team should have no more than six players from Luzon in their roster. In each quarter,teams could field a maximum of two players from Luzon, two from VisMin and one homegrown player per quarter.

Mindanao Challenge

Elimination round

Playoffs

References

2020–21 in Philippine basketball leagues
Pilipinas VisMin Super Cup